The 2019 UEFA Under-19 Futsal Championship qualifying competition was a men's under-19 futsal competition that determined the seven teams joining the automatically qualified hosts Latvia in the 2019 UEFA Under-19 Futsal Championship final tournament. Players born on or after 1 January 2000 were eligible to participate.

Teams
Apart from Latvia, a total of 34 (out of 54) UEFA member national teams entered the qualifying stage. They are seeded according to the coefficient ranking of their men's senior national teams, calculated based on the following:
UEFA Futsal Euro 2016 final tournament and qualifying competition
2016 FIFA Futsal World Cup final tournament and qualifying competition
UEFA Futsal Euro 2018 final tournament and qualifying competition

The 26 highest-ranked teams entered the main round, while the 8 lowest-ranked teams entered the preliminary round. The coefficient ranking was also used for seeding in the preliminary round and main round draws, where each team was assigned a seeding position according to their ranking for the respective draw. One team was pre-selected as hosts for the preliminary round (the hosts of Group B to be confirmed by 9 November 2018) and seven teams were pre-selected as hosts for the main round.

The draws for the preliminary round and main round were held on 1 November 2018, 14:00 CET (UTC+1), at the UEFA headquarters in Nyon, Switzerland. The mechanism of the draws for each round is as follows:
In the preliminary round, the eight teams were drawn into two groups of four containing one team from each of the seeding positions 1–4. First, the team which was pre-selected as hosts was drawn from their own designated pot and allocated to their respective group (Group A) as per their seeding positions. Next, the remaining seven teams were drawn from their respective pot which were allocated according to their seeding positions.
In the main round, the 28 teams were drawn into seven groups of four, containing one team from each of the seeding positions 1–4. First, the seven teams which were pre-selected as hosts were drawn from their own designated pot and allocated to their respective group as per their seeding positions. Next, the remaining 21 teams were drawn from their respective pot which were allocated according to their seeding positions (including the two preliminary round winners, whose identity was not known at the time of the draw, which were allocated to seeding position 4). Based on the decisions taken by the UEFA Emergency Panel, Russia and Ukraine would not be drawn into the same group. Moreover, should Kosovo advance from the preliminary round and qualify for a main round group with either Serbia or Bosnia and Herzegovina, they would be swapped with the team in seeding position 4 of the next possible main round group.

Notes
Teams marked in bold have qualified for the final tournament.
(H):  Teams pre-selected as hosts for the preliminary round and the main round

Format
In the preliminary round and main round, each group is played as a round-robin mini-tournament at the pre-selected hosts.

Tiebreakers
In the preliminary round and main round, teams are ranked according to points (3 points for a win, 1 point for a draw, 0 points for a loss), and if tied on points, the following tiebreaking criteria are applied, in the order given, to determine the rankings (Regulations Articles 14.01 and 14.02):
Points in head-to-head matches among tied teams;
Goal difference in head-to-head matches among tied teams;
Goals scored in head-to-head matches among tied teams;
If more than two teams are tied, and after applying all head-to-head criteria above, a subset of teams are still tied, all head-to-head criteria above are reapplied exclusively to this subset of teams;
Goal difference in all group matches;
Goals scored in all group matches;
Penalty shoot-out if only two teams have the same number of points, and they met in the last round of the group and are tied after applying all criteria above (not used if more than two teams have the same number of points, or if their rankings are not relevant for qualification for the next stage);
Disciplinary points (red card = 3 points, yellow card = 1 point, expulsion for two yellow cards in one match = 3 points);
UEFA coefficient for the qualifying round draw;
Drawing of lots.

Schedule
The schedule of the competition is as follows.

In the preliminary round and main round, the schedule of each group is as follows, with one rest day between matchdays 2 and 3 for four-team groups, and no rest days for three-team groups (Regulations Articles 21.04, 21.05 and 21.06):

Note: For scheduling, the hosts are considered as Team 1, while the visiting teams are considered as Team 2, Team 3, and Team 4 according to their seeding positions.

Preliminary round
The winners of each group advance to main round to join the 26 teams which receive byes to main round.

Times are CET (UTC+1), as listed by UEFA (local times, if different, are in parentheses).

Group A

Group B

Main round
The winners of each group advance to the final tournament.

Times are CET (UTC+1), as listed by UEFA (local times, if different, are in parentheses).

Group 1

Group 2

Group 3

Group 4

Group 5

Group 6

Group 7

Qualified teams
The following eight teams qualify for the final tournament.

Top goalscorers
Preliminary round: 
Main round:

References

External links

Qualification
2018–19 in European futsal
2019 in youth association football
January 2019 sports events in Europe
March 2019 sports events in Europe